Harold Elwood 'Junior' Theriault (born January 1953) is a former Canadian politician and member of the Nova Scotia House of Assembly, who represented the riding of Digby-Annapolis for the Nova Scotia Liberal Party from 2003 to 2013.

Early life
Born in East Ferry, he was the son of the late Harold Theriault and Christina Stanton. Before entering public life, Theriault was employed in the commercial fishery for over 35 years. He was actively involved in fisheries issues and served his community on many local organizations.

Political career
He was first elected in the 2003 election, and was re-elected in 2006 and 2009.

On June 29, 2012, Theriault announced that he would not reoffer in the 2013 provincial election.

Personal life
He and his wife, Dianne, have five children.

References

External links
 
 

Nova Scotia Liberal Party MLAs
Acadian people
Living people
1953 births
21st-century Canadian politicians